The Varkey Foundation, initially the Varkey GEMS Foundation, is a global charitable foundation focused on improving the standards of education for underprivileged children. It was formed in 2010 by Indian businessman Sunny Varkey, the founder and chairman of GEMS Education, the world's largest operator of private kindergarten-to-grade-12 schools. The foundation's main focuses are improving global teacher capacity by training tens of thousands of teachers and principals in developing countries; providing access to education via a variety of programmes and projects; and advocating for change in, and conducting research that can help develop, education policies worldwide.

The Varkey Foundation has partnered with a variety of major global organizations including UNESCO, UNICEF, and the Clinton Global Initiative. In 2013 it launched the Global Education and Skills Forum, an annual education summit dedicated to addressing the world's educational needs. After analyzing the public status of teachers worldwide, in 2014 it launched the annual Global Teacher Prize, a $1million award to an outstanding pioneering teacher who has had a widespread impact. Sunny Varkey who leads the foundation is a "Goodwill Ambassador" of UNESCO.

History

Launch
The foundation was formed by Sunny Varkey in 2010 as the strategic philanthropic arm of GEMS Education, and was initially called the Varkey GEMS Foundation. Its stated intention is to impact 100 impoverished children for every child enrolled at GEMS schools, or 10 million children globally, via projects such as enrollment and education-access initiatives, worldwide teacher-training programs, advocacy campaigns, policy input through strategic partnerships, and physical projects such as building classrooms, schools, and learning centers. Bill Clinton launched the foundation.

Teacher training
Beginning in 2013, the foundation's Teacher Training Programme committed to train 250,000 teachers within 10 years in under-served communities across the world. The programme began in Uganda in May 2013, and consists of a low-cost, five-day training which the recipients then cascade by training further teachers in their country. In its first year the programme trained 6,000 teachers in Uganda, and by mid 2015 it had reached 12,000 teachers.  The program is broadening to other developing countries in Africa and elsewhere.

The teacher training programme moves lessons away from focusing on students' ability to remember and repeat facts; instead, it focuses on encouraging students to apply, analyse, and create based on what they remember. The programme trains teachers to create a culture of personalised learning, with greater student participation, cooperative learning activities, and exploration of ideas. Rather than simply relying on "chalk and talk" methods of standing at the front of the classroom, teachers are taught to interact with students, and to accommodate different learning needs – including those of pupils who learn best through visual, auditory, or kinesthetic methods.

Global Education and Skills Forum
In 2013, the foundation launched the annual Global Education and Skills Forum, in partnership with UNESCO and the UAE Ministry of Education. Bill Clinton gave the inaugural keynote address at the 2013 summit.

The annual conference, which meets in Dubai in March each year, focuses on addressing the world’s educational needs, including how to achieve education for the hundreds of millions of uneducated or under-educated children in the developing world. The event is attended by hundreds of delegates from 35 to 50 countries, and speakers and participants include education ministers, current and former heads of state, business leaders, academics, and representatives of governments and NGOs. The forum also aims to increase the importance of global education issues in the concerns of large-scale philanthropy, international aid, and businesses.

Teacher Status Index
In October 2013, the foundation published the Global Teacher Status Index, a 53-page study on the public and social status of teachers in 21 countries around the world. The Indian subcontinent and sub-Saharan Africa were not included in the survey. In-depth opinion polling was done by Populus Ltd, and 1,000 respondents were polled in each country. Half a million data points were collected regarding what the general public thinks about the teaching profession and teachers, and the study examined public attitudes to professional status, trust, pay, and the desirability of teaching as a career.

Teacher status in the public eye was found to be highest in China, Greece, and Turkey, and lowest in Israel and Brazil. The U.S. and UK were in the middle. Only in China were teachers regarded as having the same status as doctors. In the UK and most other countries, teachers were most likely to be compared to social workers, whereas in the U.S., Brazil, France, and Turkey teachers were regarded as most similar to librarians, and therefore were viewed as less interactive with students. Parents in countries with a higher respect for teachers were more likely to encourage their children to become teachers. In many countries – including Japan, Brazil, Germany, France, and Italy – between one third and one half of parents would not encourage their children to enter the teaching profession.

Global Teacher Prize

In order to raise the status of teaching, at the second annual Global Education and Skills Forum in March 2014, the foundation launched the Global Teacher Prize, an annual $1 million award to an exceptional teacher who has made an outstanding contribution to the profession.

Business Backs Education
In 2014 the Varkey Foundation, together with UNESCO, co-created Business Backs Education, a global advocacy campaign that encourages businesses, companies, and corporations to support education to the same degree that they support other basic services such as healthcare. The report was written by Pratik Dattani of global advisory firm EPG and launched at the World Economic Forum in Davos Bill Clinton co-launched the initiative, which was launched in March 2014 at the second annual Global Education and Skills Forum, and BBE held its New York Summit at the September 2014 annual meeting of the Clinton Global Initiative.

On the grounds that skills shortages negatively impact companies' ability to prosper and innovate, and inequalities in educational opportunity also weaken the social and political stability needed for businesses to thrive, the BBE campaign recommends that companies worldwide allocate at least 20% of their corporate social responsibility (CSR) spending to educational initiatives by the year 2020.

In January 2015 the campaign published a report, Business Backs Education, analyzing the charitable education donations of the global top 500 companies, recommending that education be a higher priority for corporate social responsibility spending. The study revealed that the Fortune Global 500 companies spend an average of only 13% of their CSR budget on education-related activities, and less than half of the Fortune Global 500 spend any funds on education-related CSR.

Additional projects

MGCubed
In Ghana, the Varkey Foundation implements MGCubed – Making Ghana Girls Great – which equips two classrooms in each Ghanaian primary school with a computer, projector, satellite modem, and solar panels, creating an interactive distance-learning platform to deliver both formal in-school teaching and informal after-school training. The project, funded by the UK's Department for International Development (DFID), teaches 8,000 students in 72 Ghanaian schools, and is Sub-Saharan Africa's first interactive distance-learning project. The program, which was  founded by GEMS Education Solutions in 2014, aims to prevent dropping out and under-achieving among girls. Students participate more in these classes, in contrast to the standard system of learning by rote, and the video system also cuts down on teacher absenteeism. Each week, the project also brings in a role model – a successful Ghanaian woman – to speak to the students nationwide.

Other projects
The Varkey Foundation engages in a variety of projects and programs worldwide. Some of these additional projects include supporting the UNICEF Schools for Asia programme in the Philippines, Papua New Guinea, India, Nepal, and Vietnam; supporting the professional development of teachers in Palestine and providing pre-school education in Palestine camps; and establishing Learning Resource Centres in India.

The foundation has also rebuilt damaged and destroyed schools in areas including Kenya and Pakistan; provided clean water and toilets in 25 schools in Tanzania; and provided schools meals to improve access to education in India 

Some of the Varkey Foundation's partners and grantees include UNESCO, UNICEF, the Clinton Global Initiative, Oxfam, Pratham, Dubai Cares, and the Brookings Institution. The Varkey Foundation also offers strategic input and consultancy to NGO partners, including a special emphasis on campaigning on issues to increase the capacity of education systems in the developing world.

Leadership
Sunny Varkey is the founder and chairman of the Varkey Foundation. The foundation's trustees are Sunny Varkey and his sons Dino and Jay Varkey.

The foundation's chief executive officer is Vikas Pota, who was named a World Economic Forum Young Global Leader in 2013, and was elected to the  Fellowship of the Royal Society for the Encouragement of Arts, Manufactures and Commerce in 2014. He is the author of India Inc: How India's Top Ten Entrepreneurs Are Winning Globally. He also serves on several global education panels and advisory boards – including, for UNESCO, the Girls & Female Education Panel, the Teachers Task Force, and the Global Alliance of Corporate Partners for Education.

The global advisory board of the Varkey Foundation includes Andreas Schleicher, director for education and skills and special advisor on education policy to the secretary-general at the Organisation for Economic Co-operation and Development (OECD); Bertie Ahern, former prime minister of Ireland; Aliko Dangote, founder of the Dangote Group; Nizan Guanaes, chairman of Grupo ABC; Lim Hwee Hua, executive director of Tembusu Partners and former Singaporean MP; and V Shankar, chief executive officer of Europe, Middle East, Africa and Americas at Standard Chartered.

References

External links
Varkey Foundation – Official site
Global Education & Skills Forum

Organizations established in 2010
International educational charities
Child education organizations
Educational foundations
Educational charities based in the United Kingdom
Foundations based in the United Kingdom
Global Teacher Prize
2010 establishments in the United Kingdom